Frank Johannes Maria Houben is the former Queen's Commissioner for the Dutch province of North Brabant in between 22 April 1987 and 1 October 2003, when he retired after 16 years of service for Beatrix of the Netherlands. His successor was Hanja Maij-Weggen. Previously he was mayor of Luyksgestel, Vessem, Wintelre en Knegsel, and Etten-Leur.

On 20 September 2003 the mayors of the province of North Brabant planted trees in Houben Forest as a tribute to his work. The Houben forest is located near Nemerlaer Castle in the municipality of Haaren in the province of North Brabant.

Houben attended the Radboud University Nijmegen and the University of Pittsburgh. He is married with four children.

References 
  Parlement.com biography

External link

Living people
Catholic People's Party politicians
20th-century Dutch politicians
Christian Democratic Appeal politicians
Dutch Roman Catholics
Mayors in North Brabant
People from Bergeijk
People from Eersel
People from Etten-Leur
People from North Brabant
King's and Queen's Commissioners of North Brabant
Radboud University Nijmegen alumni
University of Pittsburgh alumni
Year of birth missing (living people)